Charles Jean-Pierre Lallemand (1857-1938) was a French geophysicist. He was elected a member of the French Academy of Sciences in 1910. He was the first president of the International Union of Geodesy and Geophysics He was also president of the Société astronomique de France (the French astronomical society), from 1923 to 1925.

References

Notice biographique des Annales des Mines

French geophysicists
1857 births
1938 deaths
Members of the French Academy of Sciences
Presidents of the International Union of Geodesy and Geophysics